A total of 56 teams entered the 1962 FIFA World Cup qualification rounds, competing for a total of 16 spots in the final tournament. Chile, as the hosts, and Brazil, as the defending champions, qualified automatically, leaving 14 spots open for competition.

As with previous World Cups, the rules of the qualification rounds varied by confederation. The winners of the four weakest continental zones: North America (NAFC), Central America and Caribbean (CCCF), Africa (CAF) and Asia (AFC), were not guaranteed direct spots in the final tournament. Instead, they entered a play-off against a team from either Europe (UEFA) or South America (CONMEBOL), with the winners of the three play-offs qualifying.

Format
The 16 spots available in the 1962 World Cup would be distributed among the continental zones as follows:
Europe (UEFA): 8 direct places + 2 spots in the Intercontinental Play-offs (against teams from CAF and AFC), contested by 30 teams (including Israel and Ethiopia).
South America (CONMEBOL): 5 direct places + 1 spot in the Intercontinental Play-offs (against a team from CCCF/NAFC); 2 direct places went to automatic qualifiers Chile and Brazil, while the other 3.5 places were contested by 7 teams.
North, Central America and Caribbean (CCCF/NAFC): 1 spot in the Intercontinental Play-offs (against a team from CONMEBOL), contested by 8 teams.
Africa (CAF): 1 spot in the Intercontinental Play-offs (against a team from UEFA), contested by 6 teams.
Asia (AFC): 1 spot in the Intercontinental Play-offs (against a team from UEFA), contested by 3 teams.

A total of 49 teams played at least one qualifying match. A total of 92 qualifying matches were played, and 325 goals were scored (an average of 3.53 per match).

Listed below are the dates and results of the qualification rounds.

Confederation qualification

AFC

There would be only one round of play. The 3 teams played against each other on a home-and-away basis. The group winner would advance to the UEFA/AFC Intercontinental Play-off.

CAF

There would be two rounds of play:
First round: The 6 teams were divided into 3 groups of 2 teams each. The teams played against each other on a home-and-away basis. The group winners would advance to the Final Round.
Final round: The 3 teams played against each other on a home-and-away basis. The group winner would advance to the UEFA/CAF Intercontinental Play-off.

First round

Second round

CCCF and NAFC

There would be two rounds of play:

First Round: The remaining 7 teams (Canada withdrew before the matches began) were divided into 3 groups of 2 or 3 teams each (Group 1 with teams from Northern America and Mexico, Group 2 with teams from Central America and Group 3 with teams from Caribbean). The teams played against each other on a home-and-away basis. The group winners would advance to the Final Round.
Final Round: The 3 teams played against each other on a home-and-away basis. The group winner would advance to the CONMEBOL/CCCF/NAFC Intercontinental Play-off.

First round

Second round

CONMEBOL

Among the 7 teams, Paraguay were drawn to play in the CONMEBOL / CCCF / NAFC Intercontinental Play-off. The remaining 6 teams were divided into 3 groups of 2 teams each. The teams played against each other on a home-and-away basis. The group winners would qualify.

UEFA

The 30 teams were divided into 10 groups. The groups had different rules, as follows:
Groups 1, 2, 3, 4, 5, 6 and 8 had 3 teams each. The teams played against each other on a home-and-away basis. The group winners would qualify. If the top two teams finished on level points, then a play-off at a neutral ground determined the final qualifier.
Group 7 had 5 teams. The teams played in a knockout tournament, with matches on a home-and-away basis. The group winner would qualify.
Group 9 had 2 teams. The teams played against each other on a home-and-away basis. The group winner would advance to the UEFA / CAF Intercontinental Play-off. If the top two teams finished on level points, then a play-off at a neutral ground determined the final qualifier.
Group 10 had 2 teams. The teams played against each other on a home-and-away basis. The group winner would advance to the UEFA / AFC Intercontinental Play-off. If the top two teams finished on level points, then a play-off at a neutral ground determined the final qualifier.

Inter-confederation play-offs

In each play-off, the teams played against each other on a home-and-away basis. The winners would qualify.

CAF v UEFA

UEFA v AFC

CCCF/NAFC v CONMEBOL

Qualified teams

Goalscorers

7 goals

 Andrej Kvašňák

6 goals

 Juan Ulloa
 Salvador Reyes Monteón

5 goals

 Adolf Scherer
 Bobby Charlton
 Yngve Brodd
 Charles Antenen

4 goals

 Rubén Jiménez
 Marvin Rodríguez
 Tomáš Pospíchal
 Francisco López Contreras
 Nahum Stelmach
 Omar Sivori
 Francisco Flores
 Yaúca
 Chung Soon-Cheon
 Milan Galić

3 goals

 Oreste Omar Corbatta
 Jimmy Greaves
 Maryan Wisnieski
 Edward Acquah
 Andreas Papaemmanouil
 Lajos Tichy
 Yehoshua Glazer
 Shlomo Levi
 Mario Corso
 Ady Schmit
 Sigfrido Mercado
 Abdallah Azhar
 Billy McAdams
 Ralph Brand
 Ian St. John
 Rune Börjesson
 Metin Oktay
 Albert Brülls
 Gert Dörfel
 Uwe Seeler

2 goals

 Martín Pando
 José Francisco Sanfilippo
 Rubén Héctor Sosa
 Hristo Iliev
 Dimitar Yakimov
 Manrique Quesada
 Rigoberto Rojas
 Michalis Shialis
 Dieter Erler
 Carlos Alberto Raffo
 Ray Pointer
 Bobby Smith
 Kai Pahlman
 Jacques Faivre
 Augusto Espinoza
 Carlos Humberto Suazo
 János Göröcs
 Károly Sándor
 Eduardo González Palmer
 Mohamed Khalfi
 Henk Groot
 Tonny van der Linden
 Eduvigis Rudolfo Dirksz
 Edwin Miliano Loran
 Dejo Fayemi
 Jimmy McIlroy
 Jim McLaughlin
 José Águas
 David Herd
 Denis Law
 Alex Young
 Yoo Pan-Soon
 Valentin Bubukin
 Mikheil Meskhi
 Slava Metreveli
 Viktor Ponedelnik
 Alfredo Di Stéfano
 Agne Simonsson
 Robert Ballaman
 Heinz Schneiter
 Dragoslav Šekularac

1 goal

 Ricardo José Maria Ramaciotti
 Roger Claessen
 Paul van Himst
 Marcel Paeschen
 Máximo Alcócer
 Wilfredo Camacho
 Todor Diev
 Ivan Petkov Kolev
 Petar Velichkov
 Eusebio Escobar
 Héctor Garzon González
 Carlos Vivo Goban
 Álvaro Grant MacDonald
 Jorge Hernán Monge
 Walter Pearson
 Jiří Hledík
 Josef Jelínek
 Josef Kadraba
 Josef Masopust
 Peter Ducke
 Alberto Pedro Spencer
 John Connelly
 Ron Flowers
 Johnny Haynes
 Dennis Viollet
 Mohammed Awad
 Luciano Vassalo
 Sauli Pietiläinen
 Lucien Cossou
 Jean-Jacques Marcel
 Roger Piantoni
 Ernest Schultz
 Joseph Ujlaki
 Edward Boateng
 Aggrey Fynn
 Mohamadu Salisu
 Fred Masella
 Ronald Leaky
 Flórián Albert
 Máté Fenyvesi
 Tivadar Monostori
 Ernő Solymosi
 Amby Fogarty
 Johnny Giles
 Joe Haverty
 Boaz Kofman
 Shlomo Nahari
 Reuven Young
 José Altafini
 Antonio Angelillo
 Francisco Lojacono
 Koji Sasaki
 Camille Dimmer
 Nicolas Hoffmann
 Raúl Cárdenas
 Isidoro Díaz
 Crescencio Gutiérrez
 Lahcen Chicha
 Sellam Riahi
 Godwin Emenako
 Bjørn Borgen
 Eldar Hansen
 Roald Jensen
 Faustino Delgado
 Lucjan Brychczy
 Jan Szmidt
 Mário Coluna
 Eusébio
 Gennadi Gusarov
 Aleksei Mamykin
 Valery Voronin
 Enrique Collar
 Marcelino
 Joaquín Peiró
 Alfonso Rodríguez Salas
 Luis del Sol
 August Foe a Man
 Torbjörn Jonsson
 Norbert Eschmann
 Rolf Wüthrich
 Abdelmajid Chetali
 Brahim Kerrit
 Rached Meddeb
 Abdelmajid Tlemçani
 Aydın Yelken
 Helmut Bicek
 Carl Fister
 Al Zerhusen
 Ángel Cabrera
 Luis Alberto Cubilla
 Guillermo Escalada
 Ivor Allchurch
 Phil Woosnam
 Helmut Haller
 Richard Kreß
 Zvezdan Čebinac
 Dražan Jerković
 Tomislav Kaloperović
 Bora Kostić
 Petar Radaković

1 own goal

 Romulo Gómez (playing against Argentina)
 Fernand Brosius (playing against Portugal)

Notes
 For the second World Cup in a row, no teams from Africa or Asia qualified.

References

External links

 FIFA World Cup Official Site – 1962 World Cup Qualification
 RSSSF – 1962 World Cup Qualification

 
Qualification
FIFA World Cup qualification